The Kárpátalja football team is a team representing the Hungarian minority in Carpathian Ruthenia, a historic region mostly located in western Ukraine's Zakarpattia Oblast. It is a member of ConIFA, an umbrella association for states, minorities, stateless peoples and regions unaffiliated with FIFA.

History
Kárpátalja joined ConIFA in 2016, first competing in the 2017 ConIFA European Football Cup as an invited team. They lost their first ever international game 1–0 against host nation Northern Cyprus, but defeated South Ossetia on the final day to finish 3rd in Group A and put them in the 5th place play-off. A 5–4 penalty shootout win over Ellan Vannin ensured that they finished 5th overall.

Due to their inactivity after the tournament, Kárpátalja failed to qualify for the 2018 ConIFA World Football Cup. However, after the withdrawal of Felvidék, they were admitted to the final tournament as a wildcard replacement. Kárpátalja went on to win the tournament, defeating Northern Cyprus on penalties in the final.

In October 2018, it was reported, by ConIFA, that the Football Federation of Ukraine had banned Kárpátalja players with Ukrainian citizenship from footballing activities for life, whilst Hungarian nationals on the team have been advised they can no longer enter Ukraine.

ConIFA World Football Cup record

Fixtures & Results

2014 Results

2016 Results

2017 Results

2018 Results

Current squad
The following players were called up for the 2018 ConIFA World Football Cup.

Technical staff

See also
	 
 Délvidék football team
	 
 Felvidék football team
	 
 Székely Land football team

References 

CONIFA member associations
European national and official selection-teams not affiliated to FIFA
Sport in Zakarpattia Oblast
Hungarians in Ukraine
Football in the regions of Ukraine
Football teams in Ukraine